Ri'og is a town in Dinggyê County, in the Shigatse prefecture-level city of the Tibet Autonomous Region of China. At the time of the 2010 census, the town had a population of 1,113., it had 5 communities under its administration. 

Ri'og has been a traditional trade market between Tibet and Nepal. However, due to lack of cross-border vehicle-accessible route, the trade has been limited in scale.

References 

Township-level divisions of Tibet
Populated places in Shigatse